Catenicella elegans is a species of bryozoans in the genus Catenicella. It is found in New Zealand.

References

External links 
 
 Catenicella elegans at the World Register of Marine Species (WoRMS)

Cheilostomatida
Animals described in 1852
Invertebrates of New Zealand